The 1977 Rhode Island Rams football team was an American football team that represented the University of Rhode Island in the Yankee Conference during the 1977 NCAA Division II football season. In their second season under head coach Bob Griffin, the Rams compiled a 6–5 record (4–1 against conference opponents) and finished in second place in the conference.

Schedule

References

Rhode Island
Rhode Island Rams football seasons
1977 in sports in Rhode Island